Ray Washington Traylor Jr. (May 2, 1963 – September 22, 2004) was an American professional wrestler best known for his appearances with the World Wrestling Federation (WWF) under the ring name Big Boss Man, as well as for his appearances with World Championship Wrestling (WCW) as The Boss, The Man, The Guardian Angel, and Big Bubba Rogers. During his appearances with the WWF, Big Boss Man held the WWF World Tag Team Championship once and the WWF Hardcore Championship four times. 

On March 7, 2016, Traylor was confirmed to be inducted into the WWE Hall of Fame Class of 2016. He was inducted in the WWE Hall of Fame 2016 by Slick, and the award was accepted by his wife Angela and his daughters Lacy and Megan.

Professional wrestling career

Jim Crockett Promotions (1985–1987)
A former corrections officer in Cobb County, Georgia, Traylor debuted in 1985. He then began working as a jobber for Jim Crockett Promotions, under his real name. During this time, he faced the likes of Tully Blanchard, The Barbarian, Ivan Koloff, The Midnight Express, The Road Warriors, and Wahoo McDaniel. Seeing his potential, head booker Dusty Rhodes pulled Traylor from TV for 12 weeks, in order to repackage him as "Big Bubba Rogers" with Traylor debuting as Rogers on the May 31 edition of WorldWide. As Big Bubba, Traylor was a silent bodyguard for Jim Cornette, who, along with the Midnight Express, was feuding with the James Boys (Dusty Rhodes and Magnum T. A., under masks). He got a solid push as a seemingly unstoppable heel and feuded with Rhodes (the top face at the time) in a series of Bunkhouse Stampede matches in 1986. He and Rhodes were tied for wins in this series, leading to a tiebreaking cage match, which Rhodes won on February 27. Traylor also defeated Ron Garvin in a Louisville Street Fight at Starrcade 1986.

Universal Wrestling Federation (1987)
In 1987, Traylor joined the Universal Wrestling Federation (UWF) after it was purchased by Jim Crockett. On April 19, Traylor challenged and won the UWF Heavyweight Championship from One Man Gang, who was leaving the UWF for the World Wrestling Federation. Following his title win, he aligned himself with General Skandor Akbar and his Devastation Inc. stable. Traylor would hold the championship for nearly 3 months defending it against Steve Cox, Barry Windham, and Michael Hayes before losing the title to "Dr. Death" Steve Williams on July 11, 1987 in Oklahoma City during the Great American Bash 1987 tour.

In the second WarGames match on July 30, 1987, The Road Warriors, Nikita Koloff, Dusty Rhodes, and Paul Ellering defeated The Four Horsemen and Traylor as The War Machine at 19:38 when Road Warrior Animal forced the War Machine to submit by gouging his eyes with a spiked armband.

After losing the heavyweight championship, Traylor began pursuing the UWF Tag Team Championship which were held by The Lightning Express as he teamed with The Angel of Death, The Terminator, and Black Bart but was never able to win the titles.

World Wrestling Federation (1988–1993)

Twin Towers (1988–1990) 

In June 1988, Traylor joined the WWF as "Big Boss Man", a character inspired by his previous career as a corrections officer. Wrestling as a heel and managed by Slick, Boss Man's post-match routine often included handcuffing his defeated opponents to the ring ropes and beating them with a nightstick or ball and chain.

After defeating Koko B. Ware at the inaugural SummerSlam, Boss Man began his first major WWF angle by attacking Hulk Hogan on "The Brother Love Show". During this feud, he also challenged Randy Savage for the WWF Championship, and formed a team with Akeem (formerly billed as One Man Gang, his UWF opponent) to form The Twin Towers. They feuded with Hogan and Savage (who had formed The Mega Powers), and were a key part in the top storyline of Savage turning on Hogan, leading to the WrestleMania V main event; in the later part of a tag match between the four on The Main Event II, Hogan abandoned Savage to attend to the hurt Miss Elizabeth and went backstage. After being double-teamed for a while, Savage eventually rallied until Hogan returned to the match. After Savage tagged Hogan in, he slapped Hogan and left him to defeat The Twin Towers on his own, which led to The Mega Powers' demise as Savage beat Hulk in the backstage medical room where fellow wrestlers, managers and staff had to break them up.

At WrestleMania V, The Twin Towers defeated The Rockers (Shawn Michaels and Marty Jannetty) and then, for most of spring and early summer 1989, feuded with Demolition (Ax and Smash) over the Tag Team Championship. Meanwhile, Boss Man concluded his feud with Hogan in a series of Steel Cage matches; one of the most memorable aired on the May 27 Saturday Night's Main Event XXI, with Hogan's WWF Championship on the line. During the match, Hogan superplexed Boss Man off the top of the cage.

Face turn and various feuds (1990–1993) 

The Big Boss Man turned face on the February 24, 1990 episode of Superstars, when Ted DiBiase had paid Slick to have Boss Man retrieve the Million Dollar Championship belt from Jake Roberts, who had stolen it. Boss Man retrieved a bag containing both the belt and Roberts' pet python, Damien. On The Brother Love Show, he refused to accept DiBiase's money for the bag, and returned it to Roberts.

As a face, Boss Man adopted a new entrance theme called "Hard Times" that was performed by the lead singer of Survivor, Jimi Jamison. Boss Man then feuded with former partner Akeem, defeating him in less than two minutes at WrestleMania VI. As part of his face turn, he later stopped handcuffing and beating jobbers after matches. He made peace with Hogan, appearing in his corner in his match against Earthquake at Summerslam 1990, and teaming with him at the 1990 Survivor Series, along with "Hacksaw" Jim Duggan and Tugboat, to defeat Earthquake's team.

In the fall of 1990, Boss Man began feuding with Bobby Heenan and Heenan Family after Heenan continually insulted Boss Man's mother. He won a series of matches against Heenan Family members in 1991, including The Barbarian at the Royal Rumble and Mr. Perfect (via disqualification) at WrestleMania VII in an Intercontinental Championship match, which featured the return of André the Giant. At SummerSlam, he defeated The Mountie, who he feuded with to see who the real officer of the WWF was in a Jailhouse Match, a match in which the loser must spend a night in jail; this was the only such match ever held by the promotion. 

In 1992, Boss Man began feuding with Nailz, an ex-convict character who, in a series of promos aired before his debut, claimed Boss Man had been his abusive Officer in prison, and warned he was seeking revenge. On the May 30 episode of WWF Superstars, Nailz – clad in an orange prison jumpsuit – ran into the ring and attacked Boss Man, handcuffing him to the top rope and repeatedly choking and beating him with the nightstick. Boss Man took time off TV to sell his (kayfabe) injuries, eventually returning and having a series of matches with Nailz in the latter half of 1992. The feud culminated at Survivor Series, when Boss Man defeated Nailz in a Nightstick on a Pole match. The Big Boss Man's last pay-per-view match came at the 1993 Royal Rumble, where he suffered his first clean loss on a pay-per-view to Bam Bam Bigelow.

He left the WWF shortly after a house show in Gatineau, Quebec on March 14, 1993. During the next few months he made appearances in the USWA and SMW. On December 4, 1993 he made a one-time return to the WWF as a special guest referee to officiate the main event of a house show in Anaheim, CA between Bret Hart and Jeff Jarrett. Boss Man was expected to rejoin to the WWF but elected to sign with WCW instead.

World Championship Wrestling (1993–1998)

Early years (1993–1995) 
Traylor returned to the United States to debut for World Championship Wrestling (WCW), as "The Boss", on the December 18, 1993 episode of WCW Saturday Night, pinning the International World Champion, Rick Rude, in a non-title match. A face, he received a title match against Rude at Starrcade '93: 10th Anniversary, but lost. In light of legal complaints from the WWF regarding the similarity of "The Boss" to "Big Boss Man", Traylor was renamed "The Guardian Angel", and wore similar attire to those in the organization he was named after. In early 1995, he turned heel, and became again known as "Big Bubba Rogers". He defeated Sting at Uncensored in 1995.

Dungeon of Doom and feud with nWo (1996–1998) 
In 1996, Rogers joined the Dungeon of Doom, and feuded with former Dungeon of Doom member John Tenta, along with newcomer Glacier. By the end of the year, he had turned on the Dungeon of Doom and joined the nWo. His stay in the nWo was brief, with Traylor knocked out by an unknown assailant at the start of the February 17, 1997 edition of Nitro, with Traylor later explaining Eric Bischoff fired him from the nWo while he was temporarily paralyzed. Traylor returned on September 1, now using his real name and vowing to rip Bischoff's head off, feuding with the nWo. He formed an alliance with The Steiner Brothers, who also sought Ted DiBiase as their manager. The union abruptly ended when Scott Steiner turned on them to join the nWo in February 1998. After losing his final WCW Nitro match to Bill Goldberg on the March 30 episode of Nitro, Traylor won his final match defeating Bret Hammer on the following Saturday Night; after that, he was sent home and WCW let his contract expire.

Return to WWF/E (1998–2003)

Hardcore and Tag Team Champion (1998–1999)

Traylor rejoined the WWF shortly after his WCW release and once again became "Big Boss Man". On October 12, 1998, he returned to television with a new look, abandoning his blue police shirt for an all-black SWAT-style uniform, including a tactical vest and gloves. He served as Vince McMahon's bodyguard during his feud with Stone Cold Steve Austin and his later feud with D-Generation X (DX), briefly wearing a mask before his identity was revealed.

Boss Man was one of the first members of McMahon's heel stable, The Corporation, and served as a bodyguard for other members, such as Vince's son Shane. While in The Corporation, Boss Man won the Tag Team Championship with Ken Shamrock and won the Hardcore Championship four times overall. On the November 30, 1998 episode of Raw is War, Boss Man defeated Mankind to win the WWF Hardcore Championship. A few weeks later, Boss Man and Shamrock were initially defeated by the Tag Team Champions the New Age Outlaws at the December 1998 pay-per-view Rock Bottom: In Your House; however, on the following day's Raw is War broadcast, Boss Man and Shamrock defeated the New Age Outlaws in a rematch to win the Tag Team titles. As a result, Boss Man was the holder of two championships in WWF, although Boss Man lost the Hardcore title to New Age Outlaws member Road Dogg nearly two weeks later. Boss Man entered the 1999 Royal Rumble match as the 22nd entrant, and he eliminated both X-Pac and D'Lo Brown before being eliminated by Stone Cold Steve Austin. At the same Royal Rumble event, Boss Man defeated New Age Outlaws member Road Dogg in a non-title match while Boss Man's partner Shamrock defeated the other New Age Outlaws member Billy Gunn in a separate singles match. Boss Man and Shamrock eventually lost the Tag Team titles to the team of Owen Hart and Jeff Jarrett on the January 25, 1999 episode of Raw is War. At WrestleMania XV, Boss Man and The Undertaker faced each other in a Hell in a Cell match, which The Undertaker won. After the match, The Undertaker hanged him from the roof of the cage (an illusion made possible by a body harness concealed under Boss Man's outfit).

In the WWF's hardcore division, Boss Man's major feud was with Al Snow, a feud that eventually involved Snow's pet chihuahua, Pepper. Boss Man had first won the WWF Hardcore Championship from Snow at the July Fully Loaded pay-per-view. One month later at SummerSlam, the two had a Falls Count Anywhere match that spilled into the backstage area, the street and, finally, into a nearby bar. Just prior to the match, Snow had set Pepper's pet carrier near the entranceway; minutes into the match, Boss Man picked it up, taunted Pepper, struck Snow with the carrier, and carelessly tossed it behind him. Commentator Jim Ross then immediately apologized to viewers for the act, and stated that Pepper had been removed from the box before the match. Snow ended up as the winner of the match, thus regaining the WWF Hardcore title.

Snow's reign was short-lived as Boss Man regained the Hardcore title on the subsequent episode of SmackDown!. Two weeks later, Boss Man kidnapped and ransomed Pepper, arranging a meeting in which he fed Snow a meat dish supposedly made from Pepper's remains. On the same night, Boss Man lost the WWF Hardcore title to the returning British Bulldog, in which Bulldog then gifted the title to Snow. Boss Man and Snow settled their feud in a Kennel from Hell match at Unforgiven, in which a blue solid steel cage surrounded the ring itself and also the ringside was surrounded by a chain-link fenced "cell". The object of the match was to escape from the cage and the cell while avoiding "attack dogs" (which turned out to be disappointingly docile) positioned outside the ring. Snow won the match and retained the Hardcore title. Boss Man would later win back the Hardcore title in a triple threat match involving Snow and the Big Show nearly two weeks later. Boss Man held the championship for slightly over three months, although he only defended it sparingly, which included the likes of Al Snow, Faarooq, Kane, and The Godfather.

While as Hardcore Champion, Boss Man feuded with the Big Show over the WWF Championship; during the feud, Boss Man showed up at Big Show's father's funeral, made some disrespectful remarks, then chained the casket to the back of his car and drove off. The Big Show attempted to save the coffin by jumping on it, riding it for a few yards before losing his grip and tumbling off. Boss Man became the #1 contender for the WWF Championship by defeating The Rock on the November 15, 1999 episode of Raw is War. At Armageddon, The Big Show defeated him to retain the title. On the following episode of Raw is War, The Big Show defeated Boss Man and Prince Albert in a handicap match to retain his title, marking the end of the feud.

Various tag teams and departure (1999–2003) 

On the December 30, 1999 episode of SmackDown!, Boss Man and Prince Albert defeated Test in a handicap match as part of the McMahon-Helmsley Regime's vendetta against Test. The alliance between Boss Man and Prince Albert ended on the January 13, 2000 episode of SmackDown! after they lost to the Hardy Boyz. Over the following weeks, Boss Man feuded with both Prince Albert and Test, with Test winning the WWF Hardcore Championship from Boss Man on the January 17, 2000 episode of Raw is War. Boss Man entered the 2000 Royal Rumble match, where he eliminated Rikishi, Chyna and Faarooq, before being eliminated by The Rock. On the March 19 episode of Sunday Night Heat, he introduced Bull Buchanan as his protégé. They teamed to defeat The Godfather and D'Lo Brown at WrestleMania 2000, and the Acolytes Protection Agency the next month at Backlash. On the June 5 Raw is War, after losing to The Hardy Boyz and subsequently arguing, Boss Man knocked Buchanan out with his nightstick when his back was turned and the team split up.

In the summer of 2000, Boss Man disappeared from the WWF's primary television shows, wrestling mainly on Jakked and Heat, where he had a minor feud with Crash Holly until suffering a legit injury in April 2001, keeping him out of The Invasion storyline, which featured invading WCW and ECW wrestlers, for much of the year. When he returned on the December 20, 2001 of SmackDown!, he formed a team with Booker T, after Vince McMahon ordered him to be Booker T's enforcer. On the December 27 episode of SmackDown!, Boss Man and Booker T defeated Stone Cold Steve Austin in a handicap match. On the January 7, 2002 episode of Raw, Boss Man and Booker T were defeated by Austin and The Rock. On the January 17 episode of SmackDown!, Boss Man lost to Diamond Dallas Page. At the Royal Rumble, Boss Man competed in the Royal Rumble match where he was eliminated by Rikishi. The team quietly split in late January 2002, and Boss Man returned to Jakked/Metal and Heat. In April, he formed a short-lived tag team with Mr. Perfect after both were drafted to the Raw brand. On the April 1 episode of Raw, Boss Man and Mr. Perfect lost to The Hardy Boyz. On the May 26 episode of Heat, he lost his final WWE match to Tommy Dreamer. Once again, he was taken off the main roster after an injury from a motorcycle accident.

Traylor was assigned to train developmental wrestlers in Ohio Valley Wrestling. He wrestled one match for OVW when he teamed with John Cena, and Charlie Haas defeating Lance Cade, Rene Dupree and Sean O'Haire on November 6, 2002. He was released from WWE in 2003.

International Wrestling Association of Japan (2004)
Traylor's final matches were in the International Wrestling Association of Japan, where he competed in a tournament for the vacant IWA World Heavyweight Championship. He made it to the final by defeating Freddie Krueger before losing to Jim Duggan.

Personal life
Traylor had two daughters, Lacy Abilene Traylor and Megan Chyanne Traylor, and was married to Angela, his childhood sweetheart.

Traylor suffered a motorcycle accident on his Harley-Davidson in May 2002 after he hit a deer, and was badly injured. He spent a year recovering from his injuries, and he was badly affected by close friend Curt Hennig's death in 2003.

In July 2004, Traylor unsuccessfully ran for Commission chairman for Paulding County, Georgia. He was the owner of a Dallas, Georgia storage company called RWT Enterprises.

Death and legacy

Traylor died of a heart attack on September 22, 2004 at his home in Dallas, Georgia. According to The Wrestling Observer, Traylor and his family were visiting with his sister at his home, and while his two daughters went upstairs to play, his wife Angela briefly left the room at about 10:00p.m., and returned to find him dead on the sofa. He was 41 years old. Traylor was posthumously inducted into the WWE Hall of Fame in 2016, with his wife and daughters accepting the award on his behalf.

Big Boss Man appears in video games including WWF Superstars, WWF WrestleMania Challenge, WWF WrestleFest, WWF Rage in the Cage, WWF Attitude, WWF WrestleMania 2000, WWF SmackDown!, WWF SmackDown! 2: Know Your Role and WWF No Mercy. He further appears posthumously in WWE Legends of WrestleMania, WWE All Stars, WWE '13, WWE 2K16, WWE 2K17, WWE 2K18, WWE 2K19, WWE 2K20, and WWE 2K22.

Championships and accomplishments
Pro Wrestling Illustrated
Ranked #23 of the top 500 singles wrestlers in the PWI 500 in 1992
PWI ranked him #138 of the top 500 singles wrestlers in the "PWI Years" in 2003
Pro Wrestling This Week
Wrestler of the Week (May 3–9, 1987)
Universal Wrestling Federation
UWF Heavyweight Championship (1 time)
World Wrestling Federation/WWE
WWF Hardcore Championship (4 times)
WWF Tag Team Championship (1 time) – with Ken Shamrock
WWE Hall of Fame (Class of 2016)
Wrestling Observer Newsletter
Most Improved (1987)
 Best Gimmick (1996) – nWo
 Feud of the Year (1996) New World Order vs. World Championship Wrestling
Worst Feud of the Year (1996) vs. John Tenta
Worst Feud of the Year (1999) vs. The Big Show
Worst Worked Match of the Year (1999) vs. Al Snow at Unforgiven

See also
 List of premature professional wrestling deaths

References

External links

 

realeated to anthony winter 

1963 births
2004 deaths
American male professional wrestlers
Professional wrestlers from Georgia (U.S. state)
Professional wrestling managers and valets
Sportspeople from Marietta, Georgia
New World Order (professional wrestling) members
WWF/WWE Hardcore Champions
WWE Hall of Fame inductees
20th-century professional wrestlers
21st-century professional wrestlers